Eric Walker (born 5 October 1933) is a Scottish former footballer who played as a winger.

Career 
Walker played for Alloa before joining Dundee United in 1959. After two years at Tannadice, Walker moved to Brechin City, making thirteen league appearances in his solitary season at Glebe Park.

References

1933 births
Living people
Scottish footballers
Alloa Athletic F.C. players
Dundee United F.C. players
Brechin City F.C. players
Association football wingers